The 2007–08 Irish Premier League was the fifth and final season of Northern Ireland's national football league in this format since its inception in 2003, and the 107th season of Irish league football overall. This was the last season of the competition before the league system in Northern Ireland was restructured. The 2008–09 competition onwards would be re-branded as the IFA Premiership, with stricter rules governing the eligibility of clubs wishing to take part. The top tier of the Northern Irish league system would also be reduced in size from sixteen clubs, to twelve.

The season began on 22 September 2007, and ended on 26 April 2008. Linfield were the defending champions, and successfully defended their title, winning their 48th title by 3 points. Five teams were relegated to the newly introduced IFA Championship for the following season.

League table

Results
Each team played every other team twice (home and away) for a total of 30 games.

League restructuring
From the 2008–09 season onwards, the league system in Northern Ireland was re-structured. It would be renamed as the IFA Premiership, and reduced to twelve teams, included on the basis not only of their performance in the 2007–08 season, but in the previous two seasons, and other off-the-field criteria as follows. Each applicant club was assessed by an independent panel and awarded points against the following criteria:

Sporting – based on league placings, Irish Cup, League Cup and European performances in 2005–06, 2006–07 and 2007–08; with points also awarded for running youth teams, women's teams and community development programmes.
Finance – based on solvency, debt management and cash-flow projection.
Infrastructure – based on stadium capacity, changing provisions, sanitary facilities, field of play, floodlighting, existence and standard of control room, first aid room, drug testing room and media facilities.
Personnel – based on qualification and experience of staff
Business planning
Attendances

Five of this season's sixteen Premier League teams failed to gain a place in the new twelve-team Premiership and were relegated to the newly introduced IFA Championship. Of the five teams that missed out, two of them - Armagh City and Limavady United failed to obtain the necessary domestic licence, while Larne did not apply. Donegal Celtic obtained a licence, but were ranked thirteenth in the entry list, and thus missed out by one place. Finally, Portadown also obtained a licence, but were relegated to the IFA Championship as a result of submitting their application for the IFA Premiership 29 minutes past the deadline for consideration. That left thirteen clubs to be ranked - twelve from this season's Premier League plus Bangor, who had finished third in the First Division.

Rankings

Source: BBC Sport

References

External links
 Irish Football Club Project
 Soccerway
 rsssf

North
1
NIFL Premiership seasons